Group B of the 2011 Fed Cup Europe/Africa Zone Group III was one of four pools in the Europe/Africa zone of the 2011 Fed Cup. Four teams competed in a round robin competition, with the top two teams and the bottom teams proceeding to their respective sections of the play-offs: the top teams played for advancement to the Group II.

Egypt vs. Tunisia

Ireland vs. Moldova

Norway vs. Ireland

Moldova vs. Tunisia

Norway vs. Moldova

Egypt vs. Ireland

Norway vs. Tunisia

Egypt vs. Moldova

Norway vs. Egypt

Ireland vs. Tunisia

See also
Fed Cup structure

References

External links
 Fed Cup website

2011 Fed Cup Europe/Africa Zone